Lakki Marwat is a district in Bannu Division of Khyber Pakhtunkhwa province in Pakistan. It was created as an administrative district on July 1, 1992, prior to which it was a tehsil of Bannu District.

Geography
The district is located in the southern part of Khyber Paktunkhwa. It borders Karak, Bannu and South Waziristan districts to the north, Tank district to the west, Dera Ismail Khan district to the south, and Mianwali district of Punjab to the west.

The district is a combination of hills and sandy plains. The hilly areas are along the boundaries of the district especially in the east, southeast, southwest and northwest. In the southeast, the Marwat range separates Lakki Marwat from Dera Ismail Khan District while in the east the Karak Niazi range separates it from Mianwali District. It is surrounded by Baittani range on the west and southwest, which separates it from Tank District and South Waziristan Agency. The Marwat range culminates and Baittani ranges starts near Sheikh Badin. The general elevation of these hills ranges from 500 to 1000 meters above sea level. The land beyond these hills gradually slopes to the central part, which looks like a basin. A large number of streams flow from the surrounding hills, the Kurram river flows through the district from North West to the south east and joins the Indus River south of Isakhel town. One of its important tributary is Gambila River, also known as the Tochi. The major part of this basin is an alluvial plain. The northern portion of this plain is situated chiefly in the Kurram Gambila Doab and irrigated by Kurram River. It is a flat sandy area. The southern part is made up of undulating dunes of sand, furrowed at regular intervals by deep torrent beds which carry the drainage of the Marwat and Baittani ranges to the Gambila. It is good for cultivation, water table is quite deep below the soil surface. In the western portion of the district, the soil is fairly stiff clay covered by a layer of stones at the foot of the hills. The whole district is intersected by numerous hill torrents and deep ravines. The general elevation of the plain area is about 200 to 300 meters above sea level.

Climate 
The region has all the characteristics of a desert due to its sand dunes, scorching heat and dry weather. Summers are hot, while winters are moderately cool. The summer season begins from Early May and continues till Late September. June and July are the hottest month with a maximum temperature range of 42 to 45 Degree Celsius and a minimum temperature range of about 29 to 35 Degree Celsius. Periodic sand storms rage through the area during May and June due to the Prevalent low humidity. The hot wind, locally known as Lu blows across the district in these months. The cool wave starts from somewhere in October. Late November December, January and February and Early March are the winter months. Though the daytime temperature in winter is not that low, however there is always a sharp decrease in nights. The mean maximum and minimum temperatures during this period are 20 and 4 Degree Celsius respectively. Rainfall is rare and sporadic and generally occurs in July and August.

Administration 
Lakki Marwat District is subdivided into five Tehsils:
 Lakki Marwat Tehsil
 Sari Naurang Tehsil
 Ghazni Khel Tehsil
 Bettani Tehsil
 Chichindai Kalai  (formerly Frontier Region Lakki Marwat)

The district has Three municipal committees. There are 157 mauzas (the smallest revenue unit).

Provincial Assembly

Demographics

At the time of the 2017 census the district had a population of 902,138, of which 455,402 were males and 446,732 females. Rural population was 812,886 (90.11%) while the urban population was 89,252 (9.89%). The literacy rate was 44.13% - the male literacy rate was 66.84% while the female literacy rate was 21.80%. Pashto was the predominant language, spoken by 98.70% of the population. 206 people in the district were from religious minorities.

Transport
Lakki Marwat was connected with Mari Indus through a narrow gauge railway line during the Raj. The city, a tehsil of Bannu then, was a railway junction. One line went to Bannu, its district, and the other to Tank. The extent of railways network has ever since defined the limits of the settled area bordering the tribal area to its west. The railway track has since been uprooted and the area now is connected through a network of roads. A detailed account of the rise and fall of this particular railway junction was published in the Daily Dawn .

Neighboring areas
Mianwali District
Tank District
Waziristan
Karak
Dera Ismail Khan
Bannu

See also
 Marwat
 Districts of Pakistan

References

External links
Early history of Marwats
Herbert Edwardes's description of Marwats .Hadi(1996).(1848–49)
Marwat uprising against the Sikhs (1847)
District Government Lakki Marwat
The Rise and Fall of a Railway Junction

 
Districts of Khyber Pakhtunkhwa